Giuseppe Acquaviva (died 1634) was a Roman Catholic prelate who served as Titular Archbishop of Thebae (1621–1634).

Biography
On 9 August 1621, Giuseppe Acquaviva was appointed during the papacy of Pope Gregory XV as Titular Archbishop of Thebae.
On 5 September 1621, he was consecrated bishop by Ludovico Ludovisi, Archbishop of Bologna, with Galeazzo Sanvitale, Archbishop Emeritus of Bari, and Ulpiano Volpi, Bishop of Novara serving as co-consecrators. 
He served as Titular Archbishop of Thebae until his death in 1634.

Episcopal succession

See also 
Catholic Church in Italy

References

External links and additional sources
 (for Chronology of Bishops)
 (for Chronology of Bishops)

17th-century Roman Catholic titular bishops
Bishops appointed by Pope Gregory XV
1634 deaths
Latin archbishops of Thebes